Phonewords are mnemonic phrases represented as alphanumeric equivalents of a telephone number. In many countries, the digits on the telephone keypad also have letters assigned. By replacing the digits of a telephone number with the corresponding letters, it is sometimes possible to form a whole or partial word, an acronym, abbreviation, or some other alphanumeric combination.

Phonewords are the most common vanity numbers, although a few all-numeric vanity phone numbers are used. Toll-free telephone numbers are often branded using phonewords; some firms use easily  memorable vanity telephone numbers like 1-800 Contacts, 1-800-Flowers, 1-866-RING-RING, or 1-800-GOT-JUNK? as brands for flagship products or names for entire companies.

Local numbers are also occasionally used, such as +1-514-AUTOBUS or STM-INFO to reach the Société de transport de Montréal, but are subject to the constraint that the first few digits are tied to a geographic location - potentially limiting the available choices based on which telephone exchanges serve a local area.

Advantages 
The main advantages of phonewords over standard phone numbers include increased memorability and increased response rates to advertising. They are easier to remember than numeric phone numbers; therefore when businesses use them as a direct response tool in their advertising (radio, television, print, outdoor, etc.), they are proven to increase response rates by 30–60%.

Regular side by side testing of phonewords and phone numbers in TV and radio advertising in Australia has shown that phonewords generate up to twice as many calls as standard phone numbers.  A study conducted by Roy Morgan Research in February 2006 indicated that 92% of Australians were aware of alphanumeric dialling.

Disadvantages
In the age of advanced mobile devices, there is some disadvantage in using phonewords. Devices with physical keyboards such as BlackBerry and some other smartphones do not have the apportioned letters on the keys used for dialing, so one is unable to do alphabetic dialing without some other cross-reference to the actual phone number. This can be overcome by phonewords also being accompanied by the actual numeric phone number, allowing users of such smartphones to dial using the numeric phone number.

However, devices which have virtual keyboards, including iOS and Android devices, will translate phoneword phone numbers in webpages and SMS messages to their proper digits within a hyperlink leading to that device's phone app, and their keypads show the appropriate local mapping of letters within their virtual dialpad.

Some models of smartphones allow the user to enter letters into the device’s dialing window to allow the completion of phonewords. Numerous Blackberry models allow this feature by using the ALT key when pressing a key to select the letter, and not the number on the key.

On older landline telephones, the O, Q and Z sometimes vary in placement or are omitted entirely; this is not an issue for most mobile telephones as all 26 letters must be provided to support short message service transmission.

The dialing of 1 or 0 instead of I or O in phonewords can lead to misdialed calls; one such typosquatting incident targeted 1-800-HOLIDAY (+1-800-465-4329, the toll-free direct reservations line for Holiday Inn) by subscribing 1-800-H0LIDAY (+1-800-405-4329, the same number with 'o' replaced by 'zero') to a rival vendor which stood to collect a profitable travel agent's commission.

Regional variations

Australia
Phonewords were officially introduced into Australia following the release of the appropriate number ranges by the Australian Communications and Media Authority in August 2004. The ACMA markets the rights of use to the phonewords (also referred to as smartnumbers) via an online auction.

Some phonewords have sold for as much as A$1 million with 13TAXI raising A$1,005,000. Proposed ranges for reserve prices for SmartNumbersTM are listed by Australian Communications Authority

The types of numbers that are most commonly used include those beginning with the prefixes '1300', and '1800', which are ten digits long, and numbers beginning with '13', which are six digits.

The differences between the prefixes are the length of the number (six or ten digits), the license cost to use them each year (approximately A$1 for 1800 and 1300, A$10,000 for 13 numbers) and the call cost model. 1300 numbers and 13 numbers share call costs between the caller and call recipient, whereas the 1800 model offers a national free call to the caller, with total costs of the call borne by the recipient.

Japan
Numbers can be used to spell out words in the Japanese language, a practice called goroawase. Most services are used by commercial establishments as an attempt to make their numbers easier to remember. Toll free numbers in Japan are prefixed with 0120. Examples include 0120-363963, where the numbers 3963 can also be read as サンキューローソン (sankyuu rooson, "Thank you, Lawson"), and 0120-026-999 in which 026-999 can be read as オフロでキュッキュッキュ (お風呂で急々々 ), which literally means "bath - quick, quick, quick".

North America 

Phonewords have been widely used for both local and toll-free numbers, with significant growth in the 1980s and 1990s.

Local telephone numbers have always been subject to the constraint that the first digits must identify a geographic location, leaving less flexibility to select digits which spell specific phonewords. Toll-free numbering, as originally introduced by AT&T in 1967, was initially even more limited, as each geographic area code was hardwired to one or two specific exchanges in the +1-800 toll-free area code. This changed after Roy P. Weber of Bell Labs patented a "Data base communication call processing method" which laid the initial blueprint for construction of the SMS/800 database in 1982 and the portable RespOrg structure in 1993. A toll-free number, instead of indicating a geographic location, was merely a pointer to a database record; any number could geographically be reassigned anywhere and ported to any carrier. All seven digits were available to construct vanity numbers or phonewords.

As toll-free telephone numbers, vanity 800 numbers support flexible call tracking which allows businesses to determine where their incoming call traffic is coming from, build a database of leads, access demographic information on callers, allocate personnel based on calling patterns, analyze ad campaign results and export data to other programs.  The reports help to fine-tune advertising plans and media budgets by providing detailed information on specific media buys (such as radio, television or outdoor media).

Some companies also match domain names to phone words (for instance, 1800-THRIFTY and the web site ) to target phone and web users together.

One brief practice was when the successive toll-free area codes were introduced (888, 877, 866, etc.), a business word or phrase would actually use one or more of the numbers in the area code. Examples of this were Rent-A-Wreck (1-87-RENT-A-WRECK or 1-US-RENT-A-WRECK), Speedpass (1-87-SPEEDPASS), and one of the first Vonage numbers (1-VONAGE-HELP). However, these proved to be more confusing than helpful to the callers, so the practice is not often used.

Russia 
When the telephone appeared in Russia at the beginning of the 20th century, telephone numbers mixed letters and numbers. In 1968, the letters were replaced by numbers, but recently phonewords have returned to popularity in Russia. Many ISPs offer customers vanity numbers.

United Kingdom 
Until about 1966 UK phones used a different scheme than currently used for relating letter to number keys. While generally similar, the scheme did not include the letters "O" and "Q" on the "6" and "7" keys to avoid confusion between the digit "0" and the letters; the zero key was used for "O" and "Q". "Z" was not included, and no symbols were associated with the "1" key. In earlier times exchange names were used and spoken to the operator; with the introduction of dialling, exchange names were used starting with three letters not used by any other exchange. A number would be published as WHItehall 1212, and dialled 944 1212.

Generating phonewords
Although businesses typically choose phone numbers so as to correspond to particular phonewords, it is also possible to go in the other direction, and generate phonewords corresponding to given numbers.

See also

 E.161
 Teledotcom
 Telephone exchange names
 Telephone numbering plan
 Telephone number
 Toll-free telephone number
 Vanity plate
 Custom Toll Free
 T9 (predictive algorithm)

References

Telephone numbers
Mnemonics

nl:Naambellen
ja:語呂合わせ